Synolulis is a genus of moths of the family Erebidae. The genus was erected by George Hampson in 1926.

Species
Synolulis diascia Hampson, 1926 New Guinea
Synolulis ekeikei (Bethune-Baker, 1908) New Guinea
Synolulis rhodinastis (Meyrick, 1902) Queensland, New Guinea

References

Calpinae
Moth genera